Ko Ki-Gu (born on 31 July 1980) is a South Korean footballer who plays as a forward.

His first A-match was at the East Asian Cup 2008 against China on February 17, 2008. In this match, he assisted the last goal, which was scored by Kwak Tae-Hwi.

He was member of South Korea of 2010 FIFA World Cup qualification. He played two games that played in Seoul, South Korea. The opponents were Jordan and North Korea, respectively.

Career statistics

Club

International

Statistics correct as of matches played 22 June 2008

References

External links

 National Team Player Record 
 
 

1980 births
Living people
Association football forwards
South Korean footballers
South Korean expatriate footballers
South Korea international footballers
Jeju United FC players
Pohang Steelers players
Jeonnam Dragons players
Daejeon Hana Citizen FC players
Yanbian Funde F.C. players
China League One players
K League 1 players
Korea National League players
Expatriate footballers in China
South Korean expatriate sportspeople in China
Expatriate footballers in Thailand
South Korean Buddhists